Lui Paewai (10 August 1906 – 2 January 1970) was a New Zealand rugby union player. A five-eighth and full-back, Paewai represented Hawke's Bay and Auckland at a provincial level, and was a member of the New Zealand national side, the All Blacks, in 1923 and 1924. He played eight matches for the All Blacks but did not play any internationals. He is generally regarded as being the youngest ever All Black, making his debut at the age of 17 years 36 days.

References

1906 births
1970 deaths
Auckland rugby union players
Hawke's Bay rugby union players
New Zealand international rugby union players
New Zealand rugby union players
Rugby union players from Dannevirke
Rugby union fullbacks